My Enemy, My Brother is a 2015 Canadian documentary film about two war veterans who met twenty-five years later after the Iran–Iraq War in 1980s. It is directed by Ann Shin and produced by Melanie Horkan, Hannah Donegan and Fathom Film Group. The documentary was well received by critics and earned wide spread critical acclaim. My Enemy, My Brother was shortlisted with ten other documentaries from 74 entries submitted to 88th Academy Awards in Documentary Short Subject category. The final five nominations were scheduled to be announced on January 14, 2016.

Synopsis
In 1982 Zahed was an Iranian boy who ran away from home to join the army. Najah was a 29-year-old Iraqi with a wife and son when he was conscripted to fight. When they meet on the battlefield, Zahed risks his life to save Najah. Twenty-five years later they meet again by sheer chance in Canada.

Web series and feature film
The documentary is scheduled to be developed in web series as well as feature film with the web-episode airing every Tuesday.

Accolades
 Canadian Screen Awards - Best Cinematography in a Documentary (nominee)
 SXSW Interactive Award
 FITC Award
 Premio Un Film per la Pace 2016
 San Diego Asian Film Festival 2017- Grand Jury Award

References

External links
 
  
 
 My Brother, My Enemy at the Fathom Film Group
 My Enemy, My Brother at The New York Times

2015 films
Documentary films about veterans
Films shot in Toronto
2015 short documentary films
Iran–Iraq War films
Canadian short documentary films
2010s Canadian films